The 1961 The Citadel Bulldogs football team represented The Citadel, The Military College of South Carolina in the 1961 NCAA University Division football season. The Bulldogs were led by fifth year head coach Eddie Teague and played their home games at Johnson Hagood Stadium. They played as members of the Southern Conference, as they have since 1936. In 1961, The Citadel won its first Southern Conference championship.

After the season, the Bulldogs declined two bowl invitations.  The first to be offered was the Tangerine Bowl.  The Citadel had appeared in the previous edition of this small-college bowl in 1960 and elected to decline the repeat trip.  Later, the Bulldogs declined an invitation to the Aviation Bowl.

Schedule

References

Citadel
The Citadel Bulldogs football seasons
Southern Conference football champion seasons
Citadel football